Hartland may refer to:

United States
 Hartland, California
 Hartland, Connecticut
 Hartland (Lexington, Kentucky), listed on the National Register of Historic Places in Fayette County, Kentucky
 Hartland, Maine
 Hartland (CDP), Maine, a census-designated place in the town of Hartland, Maine 
 Hartland, Michigan
 Hartland, Minnesota
 Hartland, North Dakota
 Hartland, New York
 Hartland, Vermont
 Hartland (Lewisburg, West Virginia), listed on the NRHP in Greenbrier County, West Virginia
 Hartland, Wisconsin, in Waukesha County
 Hartland Railroad Depot, Hartland, Wisconsin, listed on the NRHP in Waukesha County, Wisconsin
 Hartland, Pierce County, Wisconsin
 Hartland, Shawano County, Wisconsin

Elsewhere
 Hartland, New Brunswick, Canada
 Hartland, Devon, United Kingdom
 Hartland Point, Devon, north-west of Hartland

See also
 Hartland Institute
 Hartland Comprehensive, a school formerly known as Henry Hartland Grammar School, attended by Anna Soubry
 Hartland Township (disambiguation)
 Heartland (disambiguation)
 List of institutions and events with Heartland in their name